The 2019 McGrath Cup is a Gaelic football competition in the province of Munster, played by county teams.

Four county teams competed in 2019, with Tipperary and Kerry sitting the competition out. Clare were the winners, their first win in 11 years.

Format

Four teams compete. The contest is a straight knock-out. Drawn games go to extra time and possibly a free-taking competition.

Fixtures

References

External links
Fixtures and Results

McGrath Cup
McGrath Cup